Île des Sœurs  may refer to:

Canada
Several Quebec islands are named Île des Sœurs (lit., "nuns' island").

Nuns' Island, an island in the Saint Lawrence River, part of the city of Montreal
Île des Sœurs (Salaberry-de-Valleyfield), a former island in the Saint Lawrence River now linked to Île Papineau in Salaberry-de-Valleyfield, Quebec
Île des Sœurs (Sherbrooke), located in Sherbrooke, Quebec
Île des Sœurs (Saint-Anicet), located in Saint-Anicet, Quebec
Île des Sœurs (Duhamel-Ouest), located in Duhamel-Ouest, Quebec

See also

 Iles Soeurs, Seychelles (Souers Islands), an island group:
 Grande Soeur, Seychelles
 Petite Soeur, Seychelles
 
 
 Soeur (disambiguation)